The Baram–Thangmi languages, Baram and Thangmi are Tibeto-Burman languages spoken in Nepal. They are classified as part of the Newaric branch by van Driem (2003) and Turin (2004), who view Newar as being most closely related to Baram–Thangmi.

They were formerly classified as part of Mahakiranti by George van Driem (2001), who later retracted the hypothesis in van Driem (2003).

See also
Baram-Thangmi comparative vocabulary list (Wiktionary)

References

 van Driem, George. 2001. Languages of the Himalayas: An Ethnolinguistic Handbook of the Greater Himalayan Region. Leiden: Brill.
 van Driem, George. 2003. ‘Mahakiranti revisited: Mahakiranti or Newaric?’, pp. 21-26 in Tej Ratna Kansakar and Mark Turin, eds., Themes in Himalayan Languages and Linguistics. Kathmandu: South Asia Institute, Heidelberg and Tribhuvan University.
 Turin, Mark. 2004. Newar-Thangmi Lexical Correspondences and the linguistic classification of Thangmi. Journal of Asian and African Studies 68: 97-120.
Turin, Mark. 2011. A Grammar of the Thangmi Language: With an Ethnolinguistic Introduction to the Speakers and Their Culture. (Languages of the Greater Himalayan Region, 6.) Leiden: Brill
Kansakar, Tej Ratna; Yogendra Prasad Yadava; Krishna Prasad Chalise; Balaram Prasain; Dubi Nanda Dhakal; Krishna Paudel. 2011. A sociolinguistic study of the Baram language. Himalayan Linguistics 10: 187-225. [Contains basic word list of Baram, Thangmi, Newar, and Chepang.]

Mahakiranti languages